The Women's 4 x 6 kilometre relay biathlon competition of the Vancouver 2010 Olympics was held at Whistler Olympic Park in Whistler, British Columbia on 23 February 2010. The race consisted of four laps of cross-country skiing, each lap a total of 6 km. Every 2 km there would be a shooting zone, the first one is prone and the second one is standing. Any misses in the shooting zones count as penalties which must be completed by going around a penalty loop right after the second shooting zone. There were four racers per team, each completing one lap. As all the teams started together, the team that crossed the finish line first would win.

Results 
The following are the results of the event.

Teja Gregorin was the only competitor who failed the 2017 doping retests from the 2010 Winter Olympics. In October 2017, the International Biathlon Union said that her two samples tested positive for GHRP-2, a banned substance which stimulates the body to produce more growth hormone, in samples taken the week before competition started. She was disqualified in December 2017.

References 

Relay